Leopold Carl Müller (9 December 1834 – 4 August 1892) was an Austrian genre painter noted for his Orientalist works.

Biography
Born in Dresden to Austrian parents, he was a pupil of Karl von Blaas and of Christian Ruben at the Academy in Vienna. Obliged to support his family after his father's death, he worked eight years as an illustrator for the Vienna Figaro. Continuing his studies subsequently, he visited repeatedly Italy and Egypt, and made his name favorably known through a series of scenes from popular life in Italy and Hungary.

In the late 1860s, he visited Paris, where he was inspired by the work of Eugene Fromentin and subsequently turned his attention to the Orientalist genre. In 1877 Müller took a position as professor at the Vienna Academy and later as a rector during 1890–91. Among his pupils were several orientalists such as Ludwig Deutsch, Paul Joanowitch, Jean Discart and Charles Wilda.

His sisters were the painters Marie Müller and Bertha Müller, both well known in Austria for their portrait paintings. The third sister, Josefine, married the Austrian portrait painter Eduard Swoboda, he was the father of the painter Rudolf Swoboda and the portrait painter Josefine Swoboda.

He travelled to Egypt many times throughout his life, often staying there for six months at a time. In 1879, on his fifth visit, he travelled with his nephew and student, Rudolf Swoboda.

He died, aged 57, in Weidlingau, now part of Vienna and is buried at  "The Zentralfriedhof" ("Central Cemetery") in Vienna.

Work

He displayed his coloristic talent to greater advantage in oriental subjects, such as Arabian Money-Changers, Pilgrims to Mecca Resting, Bedouins in Camp, Camel Mart,  Young Copt Woman (New Pinakothek, Munich). Other works include The Inundation in Vienna, (1862) Old Little Matron and Last Task of the Day (both in the Vienna Museum); and Soldiers in the Thirty Years' War (Prague Gallery). He most well-known work is the Market in Cairo, (1878) which is currently held in the Österreichische Galerie Belvedere in Vienna.

See also

 Orientalism
 List of Orientalist artists

Notes

References

 

1834 births
1892 deaths
Burials at the Vienna Central Cemetery
19th-century Austrian painters
19th-century Austrian male artists
Austrian male painters
Academy of Fine Arts Vienna alumni
Orientalist painters